Louis Sorin (September 23, 1893 – December 14, 1961) was an American actor.

Biography 
Louis Sorin was born in New York City.  He appeared in 15 films between 1929 and 1961. He also acted on stage, including appearing on Broadway in more than 20 productions between 1923 and 1952.

Sorin is probably best known to modern audiences for his performances as Roscoe W. Chandler in The Marx Brothers 1930 film Animal Crackers, a role he created on the Broadway stage, and as Mr. Manicotti in the Honeymooners episode "Mama Loves Mambo" (1956).

From 1942 to 1945, Sorin portrayed Pancho on the radio series The Cisco Kid.

Sorin died in New York in December 1961 at the age of 67.

Partial filmography 
 Lucky in Love (1929)
Mother's Boy (1929)
Glorifying the American Girl (appeared with Eddie Cantor in last skit, 1929)
Animal Crackers (1930)
With These Hands (1950)

References

External links 

 

1893 births
1961 deaths
20th-century American male actors
American male film actors
American male stage actors
American male radio actors
Male actors from New York City